Back Creek Farm is a historic home located near  Dublin, Pulaski County, Virginia. It dates to the late-18th century, and is a two-story, five bay, brick I-house with a side gable roof.  It has a two-story rear ell, sits on a rubble limestone basement, and has interior end chimneys with corbelled caps.  The front facade features a pedimented tetrastyle Ionic order porch with an elegant frontispiece doorway with stop-fluted Corinthian order pilasters.  Its builder was Joseph Cloyd (1742-1833).  During the American Civil War, on May 9, 1864, the Battle of Cloyd's Mountain was fought on the property. The house served that day as a hospital and as headquarters for the Union General George Crook, under whose command were Captains Rutherford B. Hayes and William McKinley.

North of the house is the barn, a stone structure whose damage from Union artillery is still evident.  This Pennsylvania barn is built of limestone of different sorts: many of the walls are rubble, while set above the basement windows are small arches of carefully prepared stonework.

It was added to the National Register of Historic Places in 1975.

References

Houses on the National Register of Historic Places in Virginia
Houses in Pulaski County, Virginia
National Register of Historic Places in Pulaski County, Virginia